Boycotter is a 1937 Burmese black-and-white political-drama film, directed by Ba Zin and U Nu starring Aung San, U Nu, U Raschid, U Htun Ohn, Tin Swe, Hla Maung Gyi and May May Win.

Cast
Aung San
U Nu
U Raschid
U Htun Ohn
Tin Swe
Hla Maung Gyi
May May Win

References

1937 films
Burmese-language films
Films shot in Myanmar
Burmese black-and-white films